Erik Jon Spoelstra (born November 1, 1970) is an American professional basketball coach who is the head coach for the Miami Heat of the National Basketball Association (NBA). He has won two NBA championships as the head coach of the Heat. A Filipino American, Spoelstra is the first Asian-American head coach in the history of the four major North American sports leagues and the first Asian-American head coach to win an NBA title.

Spoelstra played college basketball with the Portland Pilots before playing professionally and coaching in Germany. He served as assistant coach and director of scouting for the Heat from 2001 to 2008, during which time the team won the 2006 NBA Finals. He was promoted to head coach in the 2008-09 season. Following the addition of free agents LeBron James and Chris Bosh in 2010, the Heat made four consecutive NBA Finals appearances (2011–2014) under Spoelstra, winning the championship in 2012 and 2013. Spoelstra made his fifth appearance in the NBA Finals as head coach in 2020.

Early life and education
Spoelstra was born in Evanston, Illinois, to Jon Spoelstra and Elisa Celino. Jon is Dutch-Irish-American and a former NBA executive of the Buffalo Braves, Portland Trail Blazers, Denver Nuggets, and New Jersey Nets. Elisa is a native of San Pablo, Laguna, Philippines. Spoelstra is also the grandson of Watson Spoelstra, a long-time sportswriter for The Detroit News.

He spent his childhood in Buffalo, New York, before moving to Portland, Oregon by the late 1970s. He attended Raleigh Hills Elementary and Whitford Jr. High School in Portland, before attending Jesuit High School in Beaverton, Oregon, where he excelled at point guard on the basketball team. He wore number 30 during high school and college in honor of then-Trail Blazer Terry Porter, one of his favorite NBA players. Before his senior year, Spoelstra participated in Sonny Vaccaro's Nike All-Star camp in Princeton, New Jersey, alongside future NBA players Alonzo Mourning, Shawn Kemp, Billy Owens, and Bobby Hurley.

College career
Spoelstra received basketball scholarship offers, and eventually accepted one from the University of Portland in his hometown. In 1989, he was named West Coast Conference (WCC) freshman of the year. Spoelstra was the Pilots' starting point guard for four years, averaging 9.2 points, 4.4 assists, and 2.4 rebounds per game. He is a member of the school's 1,000-point club, and is among the Pilots' career leaders in several statistical categories. During a 1990 WCC basketball tournament game against Loyola Marymount, Spoelstra was on the court standing just a couple of yards away from Hank Gathers when Gathers collapsed and later died of a heart condition. Spoelstra graduated from the University of Portland in 1992 with a degree in communications.

Professional career

TuS Herten (1993–1995) 
After graduating from the University of Portland with a communications degree, Spoelstra boxed shoes at a Nike warehouse. He then spent two years (1993–1995) in Basketball Bundesliga's second division as a player–assistant coach for TuS Herten, a professional basketball club based in Westphalia, Germany. It was in this setting where Spoelstra got his first coaching job, as coach of the club's local youth team. He began having back problems after the end of his second year with the team, and contemplated having surgery. In 1995, Spoelstra was offered another two-year contract with the club, but the NBA's Miami Heat also offered him a position. Although both offers held appeal, he chose to take the Heat position.

Coaching career

Miami Heat (1997–present)

Assistant coach (1997–2008)
Roya Vaziri, then the director of player personnel for the Heat, convinced then general manager Dave Wohl to offer Spoelstra a position with the team. Spoelstra was hired as the Heat's video coordinator in 1995, although at first he was not promised the position past the summer of that year. Pat Riley was named the Heat's head coach not long after Spoelstra's hiring. Erik's father, Jon Spoelstra, said, "Contractually, Riley wasn’t allowed to bring in his video guy, otherwise, Erik would have been out of a job right then."

After two years as video coordinator, he then served two years as an assistant coach/video coordinator. Spoelstra was promoted to assistant coach/advance scout in 1999, and later became the Heat's assistant coach/director of scouting in 2001. Many of Spoelstra's colleagues attribute his ascent in the Heat coaching ranks to his strong work ethic. As an assistant coach, he was credited for improving Heat star shooting guard Dwyane Wade's balance and jump shot after Wade's return from the 2004 Summer Olympics. Spoelstra won his first NBA championship as an assistant coach when the Miami Heat defeated the Dallas Mavericks in the 2006 NBA Finals.

Head coach promotion and struggles (2008–2011)

In April 2008, Spoelstra became the head coach of the Miami Heat after Pat Riley's decision to step down. Spoelstra was Riley's hand-picked successor. In naming Spoelstra as head coach, Riley said: "This game is now about younger coaches who are technologically skilled, innovative, and bring fresh new ideas. That's what we feel we are getting with Erik Spoelstra. He's a man that was born to coach." Spoelstra became the first ever Asian-American NBA head coach, and the first Asian-American head coach in the history of the four major North American sports leagues. He led the Heat to the NBA Playoffs in his first year as head coach, despite the team's league worst record of 15-67 the previous season. The Heat, however, were defeated in seven games by the Atlanta Hawks in the first round. Spoelstra's team once again reached the postseason the following season, but again lost in the first round to the Boston Celtics in five games.

Expectations of the team's success were raised significantly for the next season and beyond, after the free agent acquisitions of LeBron James and Chris Bosh in the summer of 2010. After the team started off the 2010–11 season with a 9–8 record, some Heat players reportedly were "frustrated" with Spoelstra, and questioned if he should remain their head coach. Chris Bosh intimated that the team was being worked too hard and that the players would rather "chill". LeBron James famously bumped into Spoelstra on his way to the bench during a timeout in a game. These two issues, coupled with the relatively poor start to the season, put Spoelstra on the coaching hot seat. The team bounced-back, however, and made the playoffs while posting the second best record in the Eastern Conference. Spoelstra led the Heat to an appearance in the 2011 NBA Finals, but lost to the Dallas Mavericks in six games. After Spoelstra failed to win a championship during his first season as head coach of the "big three" (James, Wade and Bosh), Heat executive Pat Riley was asked if he would consider returning to coach the team. Riley, however, turned down the idea and supported Spoelstra as the head coach going forward. Spoelstra received a $6 million contract extension in December 2011 which lasted through the 2013–14 NBA season.

Back-to-back championship run (2011–2013) 

The following season, Spoelstra again guided the team to the postseason as the two seed. The Heat overcame a 2–1 game deficit against the Indiana Pacers in the Eastern Conference semi-finals, and a 3–2 game deficit against the Boston Celtics in the Eastern Conference finals to reach the 2012 NBA Finals despite an injury to starter Chris Bosh that forced him to miss nine straight games. Spoelstra's Heat defeated the Oklahoma City Thunder in five games to win the NBA championship. He became the first Asian-American head coach to win an NBA championship, and the second Heat head coach to win the title. He also became the only Miami Heat head coach to take the team to the NBA Finals multiple times.

During the 2012–13 season, Spoelstra was selected as head coach of the 2013 Eastern Conference All-Stars in the 2013 NBA All-Star Game, with the Heat holding the best record in the Eastern Conference at the time of selection. He later coached the Heat to a 27-game winning streak (third longest in NBA history). It started with a 100–85 win over the Toronto Raptors on February 3, 2013, and ended with a 97–101 loss to the Chicago Bulls on March 27, 2013. The team made the playoffs as the one seed while posting the best overall NBA regular season record. After sweeping the Milwaukee Bucks in the first round, the Heat won a seven-game series with the Indiana Pacers in the Eastern Conference Finals, and advanced to face the San Antonio Spurs in the 2013 NBA Finals. The Heat defeated the Spurs in seven games and became the first team to win two straight titles since the 2009–2010 Los Angeles Lakers. Spoelstra also became the eighth coach to lead his team to two straight championships.

Later years (2013–present) 
On September 29, 2013, the Heat extended Spoelstra's contract to an undisclosed multi-year deal. Details were not released, but Spoelstra was expected to receive a pay raise and a bigger role in the front office. Spoelstra led the Heat to the 2014 NBA Finals, becoming the third coach to lead his team to four straight Finals. The Heat faced the San Antonio Spurs once again, only this time losing the series in five games. 

On December 16, 2017, Spoelstra got his 455th win as the head coach of the Heat and passed Riley for most wins in franchise history, when they defeated the Los Angeles Clippers 90–85. Topping off the 2016–17 season, Spoelstra was named the NBCA Co-Coach of the Year after leading the Heat to a 30 win record in the final 41 games of the season. 

During the 2019–20 season, Spoelstra had again coached the Heat back to the 2020 NBA Finals before falling 4–2 to the Los Angeles Lakers.

On April 28, 2021, Spoelstra earned his 600th win as the Heat's head coach, and also became the sixth head coach in NBA history to win 600 games with one team.

On February 6, 2022, Spoelstra was named as the Eastern Conference head coach for the 2022 NBA All-Star Game.

Personal life 
On September 17, 2015, Spoelstra announced his engagement to former Miami Heat cheerleader, Nikki Sapp. They married on July 22, 2016 and have two sons and one daughter together.

Head coaching record 

|-
| style="text-align:left;"|Miami
| style="text-align:left;"|
| 82||43||39||.524|| style="text-align:center;"|3rd in Southeast||7||3||4||
| style="text-align:center;"|Lost in First Round
|-
| style="text-align:left;"|Miami
| style="text-align:left;"|
| 82||47||35||.573|| style="text-align:center;"|3rd in Southeast||5||1||4||
| style="text-align:center;"|Lost in First Round
|-
| style="text-align:left;"|Miami
| style="text-align:left;"|
| 82||58||24||.707|| style="text-align:center;"|1st in Southeast||21||14||7||
| style="text-align:center;"|Lost in NBA Finals
|- ! style="background:#FDE910;"
| style="text-align:left;"|Miami
| style="text-align:left;"|
| 66||46||20||.697|| style="text-align:center;"|1st in Southeast||23||16||7||
| style="text-align:center;"|Won NBA Championship
|- ! style="background:#FDE910;"
| style="text-align:left;"|Miami
| style="text-align:left;"|
| 82||66||16|||| style="text-align:center;"|1st in Southeast||23||16||7||
| style="text-align:center;"|Won NBA Championship
|-
| style="text-align:left;"|Miami
| style="text-align:left;"|
| 82||54||28|||| style="text-align:center;"|1st in Southeast||20||13||7||
| style="text-align:center;"|Lost in NBA Finals
|-
| style="text-align:left;"|Miami
| style="text-align:left;"|
| 82||37||45|||| style="text-align:center;"|3rd in Southeast|||—||—||—||—
| style="text-align:center;"|Missed playoffs
|-
| style="text-align:left;"|Miami
| style="text-align:left;"|
| 82||48||34|||| style="text-align:center;"|1st in Southeast||14||7||7||
| style="text-align:center;"|Lost in Conference Semifinals
|-
| style="text-align:left;"|Miami
| style="text-align:left;"|
| 82||41||41|||| style="text-align:center;"|3rd in Southeast|||—||—||—||—
| style="text-align:center;"|Missed playoffs
|-
| style="text-align:left;"|Miami
| style="text-align:left;"|
| 82||44||38|||| style="text-align:center;"|1st in Southeast||5||1||4||
| style="text-align:center;"|Lost in First Round
|-
| style="text-align:left;"|Miami
| style="text-align:left;"|
| 82||39||43|||| style="text-align:center;"|3rd in Southeast|||—||—||—||—
| style="text-align:center;"|Missed playoffs
|-
| style="text-align:left;"|Miami
| style="text-align:left;"|
| 73||44||29|||| style="text-align:center;"|1st in Southeast|||21||14||7||
| style="text-align:center;"|Lost in NBA Finals
|-
| style="text-align:left;"|Miami
| style="text-align:left;"|
| 72||40||32|||| style="text-align:center;"|2nd in Southeast||4||0||4||
| style="text-align:center;"|Lost in First Round
|-
| style="text-align:left;"|Miami
| style="text-align:left;"|
| 82||53||29|||| style="text-align:center;"|1st in Southeast||18||11||7||
| style="text-align:center;"|Lost in Conference Finals
|- class="sortbottom"
| style="text-align:center;" colspan="2" |Career
| 1,113||660||453|||| ||161||96||65||||

See also

References

External links

Rafe Bartholomew, "Spoelstra in the Philippines", Grantland.com, September 28, 2011.
Kevin Arnovitz, "The book on Erik Spoelstra", ESPN.com, May 30, 2012.

1970 births
Living people
American expatriate basketball people in Germany
American men's basketball coaches
American men's basketball players
American people of Dutch descent
American people of Irish descent
American sportspeople of Filipino descent
Basketball coaches from Illinois
Basketball coaches from New York (state)
Basketball coaches from Oregon
Basketball players from Illinois
Basketball players from Buffalo, New York
Basketball players from Portland, Oregon
Filipino men's basketball players
Jesuit High School (Beaverton, Oregon) alumni
Miami Heat assistant coaches
Miami Heat head coaches
National Basketball Association championship-winning head coaches
Point guards
Portland Pilots men's basketball players
Sportspeople from Buffalo, New York
Sportspeople from Evanston, Illinois
Sportspeople from Portland, Oregon